The Missing Rembrandt is a 1932 British mystery film directed by Leslie S. Hiscott and starring Arthur Wontner, Jane Welsh, Miles Mander, and Francis L. Sullivan. It is considered a lost film. The film was loosely based on the 1904 Sherlock Holmes story "The Adventure of Charles Augustus Milverton" by Arthur Conan Doyle.

It is the second film in the 1931–1937 film series starring Wontner as Sherlock Holmes.

Plot
Sherlock Holmes goes on the trail of a Rembrandt painting, stolen by a drug-addicted artist.

Cast
Arthur Wontner as Sherlock Holmes
Jane Welsh as Lady Violet Lamsden
Miles Mander as Claude Holford
Francis L. Sullivan as Baron von Guntermann
Ian Fleming as Doctor Watson
Dino Galvani as Carlo Ravelli
Philip Hewland as Inspector Lestrade
Minnie Rayner as Mrs Hudson
Herbert Lomas as Manning

Reception
The New York Times reviewer wrote that, though it is "slightly changed as to action and entirely as to title, provides both excitement and laughter" and "brings back a number of screen actors who by this time seem to be perfectly at home in their parts."

See also
List of lost films

References

External links

1932 films
British black-and-white films
British mystery films
1930s English-language films
Films directed by Leslie S. Hiscott
Lost British films
Sherlock Holmes films
1932 mystery films
1932 lost films
1930s British films
Lost mystery films